Callicereon is a monotypic moth genus of the family Noctuidae erected by Arthur Gardiner in 1882. Its only species, Callicereon heterochroa, was first described by Paul Mabille in 1879. It is found on Madagascar.

References

Amphipyrinae
Monotypic moth genera